Raichur Fort (Kannada: ರಾಯಚೂರು ಕೋಟೆ) is a fortress located on a hilltop in the heart of the Raichur in North Karnataka.

The Raichur region (Raichur Doab) has been ruled by several families; the Kakatiya dynasty, Rashtrakutas, Vijayanagar Empire, Bahmanis and Nizams.

History 
Fortifications have existed since the time of the Chalukyas of Badami ; during the rule of Chalukyas of Kalyani the fort was renovated. The present fort was constructed in 1294 CE during Kakatiya rule. An inscription records that it was built by Raja Vithala by order of Raja Gore Gangaya Raddivaru, minister of Queen Rudramma Devi. 

During the rule of Vijayanagara Empire, Krishnadevaraya built the north entrance in celebration of one of his conquests.

The fort is known for its many inscriptions, in several languages.

In March 2011, 95 red granite balls and a cannon dated to the 13th Century were discovered by engineers cleaning the north west wall of the fort.

See also

 Malliabad Fort
 Jaladurga
 Mudgal Fort
 Vijayanagar Empire
 Chalukyas
 Kakatiyas
 Musunuri Nayaks
 Raichur
 Forts of Karnataka
 North Karnataka

References

External links

Forts in Karnataka
Buildings and structures in Raichur district
Tourist attractions in Raichur district